In enzymology, an undecaprenyl-phosphate galactose phosphotransferase is an enzyme that catalyzes the chemical reaction

UDP-galactose + undecaprenyl phosphate  UMP + alpha-D-galactosyl-diphosphoundecaprenol

Thus, the two substrates of this enzyme are UDP-galactose and undecaprenyl phosphate, whereas its two products are UMP and alpha-D-galactosyl-diphosphoundecaprenol.

This enzyme belongs to the family of transferases, specifically those transferring non-standard substituted phosphate groups.  The systematic name of this enzyme class is UDP-galactose:undecaprenyl-phosphate galactose phosphotransferase. Other names in common use include poly(isoprenol)-phosphate galactose phosphotransferase, poly(isoprenyl)phosphate galactosephosphatetransferase, and undecaprenyl phosphate galactosyl-1-phosphate transferase.

References

 
 

EC 2.7.8
Enzymes of unknown structure